Ivan Pavlovich Zhukov (1889 – 30 October 1937) was a Soviet politician and statesman. He was a member of the Central Committee elected by the 17th Congress of the All-Union Communist Party (Bolsheviks) He received the Order of Lenin in 1931. During the Great Purge, he was arrested on 21 June 1937, sentenced to death on 29 October 1937 and executed by firing squad the following day. After the death of Joseph Stalin, he was rehabilitated in 1956.

References 

1889 births
1937 deaths
Recipients of the Order of Lenin
Bolsheviks
Great Purge victims from Russia
Soviet politicians
People executed by firing squad
Central Committee of the Communist Party of the Soviet Union members